The 13th edition of the Ronde van Drenthe, a women's cycling race in the Netherlands, will be held on 17 March 2019. The race covers 11 cobbled sections and three ascents of the VAM-berg. It will be the second race of the 2019 UCI Women's World Tour.

Teams
20 UCI teams will enter the race, as well as a Dutch national team. Each team has a maximum of six riders:

References 

2019 UCI Women's World Tour